The England–Wales border, sometimes referred to as the Wales–England border or the Anglo-Welsh border,  runs for  from the Dee estuary, in the north, to the Severn estuary in the south, separating England and Wales.

It has followed broadly the same line since the 8th century, and in part that of Offa's Dyke; the modern boundary was fixed in 1536, when the former marcher lordships which occupied the border area were abolished and new county boundaries were created. The administrative boundary of Wales was confirmed in the Local Government Act 1972. Whether Monmouthshire was part of Wales, or an English county treated for most purposes as though it were Welsh, was also settled by the 1972 Act, which included it in Wales.

Geography 

The modern boundary between Wales and England runs from the salt marshes of the Dee estuary adjoining the Wirral Peninsula, across reclaimed land to the River Dee at Saltney just west of Chester. It then loops south to include within England an area southwest of Chester, before rejoining the Dee, and then loops east of the river to include within Wales a large area known as Maelor, formerly an exclave of Flintshire, between Bangor-on-Dee (in Wales) and Whitchurch, Shropshire (in England). It follows the Vyrnwy to its confluence with the River Severn, and then continues southwards, rising over Long Mountain east of Welshpool. It then runs westwards to the River Teme, and follows the river southeastwards through Knighton before turning south towards the River Lugg at Presteigne, which is within Wales.

The boundary continues southwards across hills to the River Wye, and follows the river upstream for a short distance to Hay-on-Wye, on the Welsh side of the border. It continues southwards and rises through and across the Black Mountains, following the Hatterall Ridge past Llanthony on the Welsh side and Longtown, Herefordshire on the English side, to reach the River Monnow near Pandy. It then generally follows the river, past Pontrilas (in England) and Skenfrith (in Wales), towards Monmouth, looping eastwards to include the town itself and a surrounding area within Wales. At Redbrook, the boundary again reaches the Wye, and follows the river southwards, past Tintern and Chepstow on the Welsh side, to its confluence with the Severn at the Severn Bridge. The boundary then continues down the Severn estuary towards the Bristol Channel, with the small island of Flat Holm being administered as part of Wales and the neighbouring island of Steep Holm as part of England.

Administrative boundary 
The boundary passes between Flintshire, Wrexham County Borough, Powys, and Monmouthshire in Wales and Cheshire, Shropshire, Herefordshire and Gloucestershire in England.

There are several places where the border runs along the centre of a lane or street, resulting in properties on one side of the street being in Wales and those on the other side being in England. Notable examples include Boundary Lane in Saltney and the main street of Llanymynech.

History

Ancient Britain 

Before and during the Roman occupation of Britain, all the native inhabitants of the island (other than the Pictish/Caledonian tribes of what is now northern Scotland—and also excepting the Lloegyr of greater south-east Britain) spoke Brythonic languages, a sub-family of the Insular Celtic languages, and were regarded as Britons. The topographical contrast between the mountainous western areas and the generally lower-lying areas to the east is reflected in the nature of ancient settlements, with the majority of hillforts in Britain found in this western area.

Roman era 

During the Roman occupation, the tribes of Wales (Ordovices, Deceangli, Demetae, and especially the Silures) were noted by Roman authors as fiercely resisting any occupation. As such the border area became a centre of military activity, with legions based at Deva (Chester), Viroconium (Wroxeter), and Isca Augusta (Caerleon).

In most of Wales, the militaristic nature of the occupation was in stark contrast to that of southeast Britain. As such, by the end of Roman rule, there would have been a cultural border, between the highly Romanised Romano-British in the east, and the more independent and tribal kingdoms to the west. This western area was, however, largely Christian, and a number of successor states attempted to continue Roman practices. The most successful of these were the Kingdom of Gwynedd in the northwest, the Kingdom of Gwent and Glywysing in the southeast, the Kingdom of Dyfed in the southwest and the Kingdom of Powys in the east. Powys roughly coincided with the territory of the Celtic Cornovii tribe whose civitas or administrative centre during the Roman period was at Viroconium. Gwynedd, at the height of its power, extended as far east as the Dee estuary. Gradually, from the 5th century onwards, pagan tribes from the east, including the Angles and Saxons, conquered eastern and southern Britain, which later became England.

In the south, the Welsh kingdom of Gwent broadly covered the same area as the pre-Roman Silures, traditionally the area between the rivers Usk, Wye and the Severn estuary. It was centred at different times on Venta (Caerwent), from which it derived its name, and Isca Augusta (Caerleon). Gwent generally allied with, and at various times was joined with, the smaller Welsh kingdom of Ergyng, centred in present-day southern Herefordshire west of the Wye (and deriving its name from the Roman town of Ariconium); and the larger kingdom of Glywysing in modern Glamorgan. The name Glywysing may indicate that it was founded by a British native of Glevum (Gloucester).

Medieval era 

The Battle of Mons Badonicus, circa 500, could have been fought near Bath between the British, the victors, and Anglo-Saxons attempting to reach the Severn estuary, but its date and location are very uncertain and it may equally well have taken place in Somerset or Dorset. However, it is more certain that the Anglo-Saxon kingdom of Wessex emerged in the 6th and 7th centuries in the upper Thames valley, Cotswolds and Hampshire areas. In 577, the Battle of Deorham in the southern Cotswolds was won by the Anglo-Saxons, and led to Wessex extending its control to the Severn estuary and the cities of Gloucester, Cirencester, and Bath. This severed the land link between the Britons of Wales and those of the south west peninsula. By about 600, however, the area of modern Gloucestershire east of the Severn, as well as most of Worcestershire, was controlled by another group, the Hwicce, who may have arisen from intermarriage between Anglo-Saxon and British leading families, possibly the successors to the pre-Roman Dobunni. The Hwicce came increasingly under Mercian hegemony.

At the Battle of Chester in 616, the forces of Powys and other allied Brythonic kingdoms were defeated by the Northumbrians under Æthelfrith. This divided the Britons of Wales from those in Northern England, including Lancashire, Cumbria, and south west Scotland, an area which became known as "Yr Hen Ogledd" or "the Old North". Within a few decades, the Welsh became engaged in further defensive warfare against the increasingly powerful kingdom of Mercia, based at Tamworth in what became the West Midlands of England. The capital of Powys, Pengwern, at or near modern Shrewsbury, was conquered by Oswiu of Northumbria in 656 when he had become overlord of the Mercians. Powys then withdrew from the lowland areas now in southern Cheshire, Shropshire and Herefordshire, which became known to Welsh poets as "The Paradise of Powys". The areas were occupied by Anglo-Saxon groups who became sub-kingdoms of Mercia, the Wreocensǣte or Wrekinset in the northern part of what became Shropshire, and the Magonsæte in the southern part. Further south, the area north west of the Severn later known as the Forest of Dean seems to have remained in British (that is, Welsh) hands until about 760.

Offa's Dyke 

After Ine of Wessex abdicated in 726, Æthelbald of Mercia established Mercia's hegemony over the Anglo-Saxons south of the Humber. However, campaigns by Powys against Mercia led to the building of Wat's Dyke, an earthwork boundary extending from the Severn valley near Oswestry to the Dee at Basingwerk in what became Flintshire, perhaps to protect recently acquired lands. After Æthelbald was killed in 757, a brief civil war in Mercia then ended in victory for his distant cousin, Offa. As king, he rebuilt Mercia's hegemony over the southern English through military campaigns, and also caused the construction of Offa's Dyke, around the years 770 and 780.

It is much larger and longer than Wat's Dyke, and runs roughly parallel to it. The earthwork was generally dug with the displaced soil piled into a bank on the Mercian (eastern) side, providing an open view into Wales and suggesting that it was built by Mercia to guard against attacks or raids from Powys. The late 9th-century writer Asser wrote that Offa "terrified all the neighbouring kings and provinces around him, and ... had a great dyke built between Wales and Mercia from sea to sea". In the mid-20th century, Sir Cyril Fox completed a major survey of the Dyke and stated that it ran from the Dee to the Severn, as Asser suggested, but with gaps, especially in the Herefordshire area, where natural barriers of strong rivers or dense forests provided sufficient defence. Earthworks in the far north and south, including sections overlooking the Wye valley and east of the Wye at Beachley, may in their view have been built for different purposes at different times, although their conclusions are themselves disputed.

Offa's Dyke largely remained the frontier between the Welsh and English in later centuries. By the 9th century, the expanding power of Mercia led to it gaining control over Ergyng and nearby Hereford. The system of shires which was later to form the basis of local administration throughout England and eventually Wales originated in Wessex, where it became established during the 8th century. Wessex and Mercia gradually established an occasionally unstable alliance, with Wessex gaining the upper hand. According to Asser, the southern Welsh kings, including Hywel ap Rhys of Glywysing, commended themselves to Alfred the Great of Wessex in about 885. Alfred's son Edward the Elder also secured homage from the Welsh, although sporadic border unrest continued. In the early 10th century, a document known as The Ordinance Concerning the Dunsaete records procedures for dealing with disputes between the English and the Welsh, and implies that areas west of the Wye in Archenfield were still culturally Welsh. It stated that the English should only cross into the Welsh side, and vice versa, in the presence of an appointed man who had the responsibility of making sure that the foreigner was safely escorted back to the crossing point. In 926, Edward's successor Athelstan, "King of the English", summoned the Welsh kings including Hywel Dda of Deheubarth to a meeting at Hereford, and according to William of Malmesbury laid down the boundary between England and Wales, particularly the disputed southern stretch where he specified that the eastern bank of the Wye should form the boundary.

By the mid-eleventh century, most of Wales had become united under the king of Gwynedd, Gruffudd ap Llywelyn. In 1055, he marched on Hereford and sacked the city. He also seized Morgannwg and the Kingdom of Gwent, together with substantial territories east of Offa's Dyke, and raided as far as Chester and Leominster. He claimed sovereignty over the whole of Wales, a claim recognised by the English, and historian John Davies states that Gruffudd was "the only Welsh king ever to rule over the entire territory of Wales.". However, after his most powerful ally – Earl Elfgar of Mercia and East Anglia – died, Harold and Tostig Godwinson took advantage of the situation – Gruffudd being besieged in Snowdonia – and invaded Wales. In 1063, Gruffudd was killed by his own men. Harold returned many of the Welsh princes their lands, so that after Harold's death at the Battle of Hastings, Wales was again divided without a leader to resist the Normans.

March of Wales 

Immediately after the Norman conquest of England, King William installed one of his most trusted confidants, William FitzOsbern, as Earl of Hereford. By 1071 he had started the building of Chepstow Castle, the first castle in Britain built of stone, near the mouth of the Wye. It served as a base from which the Normans continued to expand westward into south Wales, establishing a castle at Caerleon and extinguishing the Welsh kingdom of Gwent. William also installed Roger de Montgomerie at Shrewsbury, and Hugh d'Avranches at Chester, creating a new expansionist earldom in each case. In the Domesday Book of 1086, Norman lands are recorded west of the Wye at Chepstow and Caldicot in the Gwent Levels; over the whole of north east Wales as far west as the River Clwyd, an area known to the Welsh as the Perfeddwlad; and west of Offa's Dyke, especially in Powys where a new castle was named, after its lord, Montgomery.

Domesday Book no doubt records the extent of English penetration into Wales. This suggests that Offa's Dyke still approximately represented the boundary between England and Wales. However, during the anarchy of Stephen various Welsh princes were able to occupy lands beyond it, including Whittington, Shropshire (see Whittington Castle) and Maelor Saesneg, hitherto in England. These lands were brought under English lordship by Henry II of England, but became Marcher lordships, and so part of Wales. This involved a loss of direct rule by the English crown.

Over the next four centuries, Norman lords established mostly small lordships, at times numbering over 150, between the Dee and Severn and further west. The precise dates and means of formation of the lordships varied, as did their size. Hundreds of small castles, mostly of the motte and bailey type, were built in the border area in the 12th and 13th centuries, predominantly by Norman lords as assertions of power as well as defences against Welsh raiders and rebels. Many new towns were established across the area, some such as Chepstow, Monmouth, Ludlow and Newtown becoming successful trading centres, and these tended to be a focus of English settlement. However, the Welsh continued to attack English soil and supported rebellions against the Normans.

The Marches, or Marchia Wallia, were to a greater or lesser extent independent of both the English monarchy and the Principality of Wales, which remained based in Gwynedd in the north west of the country. By the early 12th century, they covered the areas which would later become Monmouthshire and much of Flintshire, Montgomeryshire, Radnorshire, Brecknockshire, Glamorgan, Carmarthenshire and Pembrokeshire. Some of the lordships, such as Oswestry, Whittington, Clun, and Wigmore had been part of England at the time of Domesday, while others such as the Lordship of Powys were Welsh principalities that passed by marriage into the hands of Norman barons. In ecclesiastical terms, the ancient dioceses of Bangor and St. Asaph in the north, and St. David's and Llandaff in the south, collectively defined an area which included both the Principality and the March, and coincided closely with later definitions of Wales.

The Principality of Wales covered the lands ruled by the Prince of Wales directly, and was formally founded in 1216, and later recognised by the 1218 Treaty of Worcester between Llywelyn ab Iorwerth, Prince of Gwynedd, and King John of England. Encompassing two-thirds of modern Wales, the principality operated as an effectively independent entity from the reign of Llywelyn until 1283 (though it underwent a period of contraction during the early part of the reign of Dafydd ap Llywelyn in the 1240s, and again for several years from the beginning of Llywelyn ap Gruffudd's rule in 1246). Its independence was characterised by a separate legal jurisprudence based on the well established laws of Cyfraith Hywel, and by the increasingly sophisticated court of the Aberffraw dynasty.

The Statute of Rhuddlan in 1284 followed the conquest of the Principality by Edward I of England. It assumed the lands held by the Princes of Gwynedd under the title "Prince of Wales" as legally part of the lands of England, and established shire counties on the English model over those areas. The Council of Wales, based at Ludlow Castle, was also established in the 15th century to govern the area.

Formation of "England and Wales" and county boundaries 

However, the Marches remained outside the shire system, and at least nominally outside the control of the English monarchy, until the first Laws in Wales Act was introduced in 1535 under Henry VIII. Henry had not seen the need to reform the government of Wales at the beginning of his reign, but gradually he perceived a threat from some of the remaining Marcher lords and therefore instructed his chief minister, Thomas Cromwell, to seek a solution.
This, and a further Act in 1542, had the effect of annexing Wales to England and creating a single state and legal jurisdiction, commonly referred to as England and Wales. The powers of the marcher lordships were abolished, and their areas formed into new counties, or amalgamated into existing ones.
At this point, the boundary between England and Wales, which has existed ever since, was effectively fixed. In the border areas, five new counties were created – Denbighshire, Montgomeryshire, Radnorshire, Brecknockshire and Monmouthshire – and Flintshire gained some additional territory. However, several of the marcher lordships were incorporated in whole or in part into English counties. The lordships of Ludlow, Clun, Caus and part of Montgomery were incorporated into Shropshire; and Wigmore, Huntington, Clifford and most of Ewyas were included in Herefordshire. According to John Davies:

Thus was created the border between Wales and England, a border which has survived until today. It did not follow the old line of Offa's Dyke nor the eastern boundary of the Welsh dioceses; it excluded districts such as Oswestry and Ewias, where the Welsh language would continue to be spoken for centuries, districts which it would not be wholly fanciful to consider as Cambria irredenta. Yet, as the purpose of the statute was to incorporate Wales into England, the location of the Welsh border was irrelevant to the purposes of its framers.

An 1844 Act of Parliament later abolished several enclaves. One of these, Welsh Bicknor, was an exclave of Monmouthshire between Gloucestershire and Herefordshire.

Monmouthshire 

Although Monmouthshire was included in the 16th century legislation, it was treated anomalously, with the result that its legal status as a Welsh county fell into some ambiguity and doubt until the 20th century. It was omitted from the second Act of Union, which established the Court of Great Sessions, and like English shires it was given two Knights of the Shire, rather than one as elsewhere in Wales. However, in ecclesiastical terms, almost all of the county remained within the Diocese of Llandaff, and most of its residents at the time spoke Welsh. In the late 17th century under Charles II it was added to the Oxford circuit of the English Assizes, following which, according to the 1911 Encyclopædia Britannica, it gradually "came to be regarded as an English county". Under that interpretation, the boundary between England and Wales passed down the Rhymney valley, along Monmouthshire's western borders with Brecknockshire and Glamorgan, so including Newport, and other industrialised parts of what would now generally be considered to be South Wales, within England.

The 1911 Encyclopædia Britannica unambiguously described the county as part of England, but noted that "whenever an act [...] is intended to apply to [Wales] alone, then Wales is always coupled with Monmouthshire". Some legislation and UK government decisions, such as the establishment of a "Royal Commission on Ancient and Historical Monuments in Wales and Monmouthshire" in 1908, referred to "Wales and Monmouthshire", so that it was treated as one with Wales rather than as a legal part of Wales. The county's status continued to be a matter of debate in Parliament, especially as Welsh nationalism and devolution climbed the political agenda in the 20th century. In 1921 the area was included within the Church in Wales. The Welsh Office, established in 1965, included Monmouthshire within its remit, and in 1969 George Thomas, Secretary of State for Wales, proposed to fully incorporate Monmouthshire into Wales. The issue was finally clarified in law by the Local Government Act 1972, which provided that "in every act passed on or after 1 April 1974, and in every instrument made on or after that date under any enactment (whether before, on or after that date) "Wales", subject to any alterations of boundaries..." included "the administrative county of Monmouthshire and the county borough of Newport". The legal boundary between England and Wales therefore passes along Monmouthshire's eastern boundaries with Herefordshire and Gloucestershire, essentially along the River Monnow and River Wye.

The border today

English and Welsh boundaries 

The first legislation applying solely to Wales since the 16th century was passed in 1881. Subsequently, the border between England and Wales has taken on increasing legal and political significance.

Until the Welsh Disestablishment in 1920, the Diocese of St Asaph covered parts of north-west Shropshire. The parishes transferred to the Diocese of Lichfield were: Criftins, Hengoed, Kinnerley, Knockin, Llanyblodwell, Llanymynech, Melverley, Morton, Oswestry, St Martins, Selattyn, Trefonen, Weston Rhyn and Whittington.

In 1965, a separate department of state was established for Wales – the Welsh Office – which assumed an increasing range of administrative responsibilities from Whitehall. By 1992, the Welsh Office oversaw housing, local government, roads, historic buildings, health, education, economic development, agriculture, fisheries and urban regeneration, although the extent to which it was able to be autonomous from England in public policy is a matter of debate.

The establishment of devolved government in Wales through the Welsh Assembly, set up in 1999, has led to a divergence between England and Wales on some government policies. One such is the fact that prescription charges were abolished in Wales in 2007. In 2008, residents of the village of Audlem, Cheshire,  from the border, "voted" to become part of Wales in what was originally a joke ballot. Some residents sought to make a case for securing Welsh benefits such as free hospital parking and prescriptions. The modern border lies between the town of Knighton and its railway station, and divides the village of Llanymynech where a pub straddles the line. Knighton is the only town that can claim to be on the border as well as on Offa's Dyke. The postal and ecclesiastical borders are in places slightly different – for example the Shropshire village of Chirbury has Montgomery, as its post town, and the Welsh town of Presteigne is in the English Diocese of Hereford.

National League North football club Chester F.C.'s ground at Deva Stadium straddles the border, with the car park and some of the offices in England but the pitch in Wales.  In the 2021–22 season, the club were threatened with legal action for failing to apply the COVID-19 regulations applying in Wales and allowing crowds to attend matches at the ground.

A competition was launched in 2005 to design one or more new iconic images, along the same lines as the "Angel of the North", to be placed at the borders of Wales. This became known as the "Landmark Wales" project, and a shortlist of 15 proposals was unveiled in 2007. However, the proposal was shelved after it failed to receive Lottery funding.

The main road links over the border in the south are the M4 Second Severn Crossing and the M48 Severn Bridge. 
In July 2017, the Welsh Secretary, Alun Cairns, announced that tolls would be abolished at the end of 2018, claiming that this would boost the South Wales economy by around £100m a year. In September 2017, Cairns confirmed that tolls would be reduced in January 2018 when VAT was removed. All tolls ceased on 17 December 2018.

Lost Lands of Wales 

The Lost Lands of Wales was a minor political idea of the mid-1960s which called into question the status of areas along the east side of the England–Wales border, which its proponents regarded as Welsh. The idea related to parts of the counties of Cheshire, Gloucestershire, Herefordshire and Shropshire.

The Lost Lands Liberation League was reportedly a minor group in the 1960s claiming to recover the "Lost Lands" for Wales. Some Welsh nationalist organisations have campaigned on the issue, although Plaid Cymru does not. The group is associated with Gethin ap Gruffydd.

Place names 

In general, placenames of Welsh origin are found to the west of the border, and those of English origin to the east. However, many historically Welsh names are also found east of the border, particularly around Oswestry in northern Shropshire, such as Gobowen and Trefonen; in southern Shropshire, such as Clun; and in southern Herefordshire, such as Kilpeck and Pontrilas. Most of these areas were not incorporated fully into England until the 16th century, and native Welsh speakers still lived there until at least the 19th century. Equally, placenames of English origin can be found on the Welsh side of the border where there was Mercian and Norman settlement, particularly in the north east, such as Flint, Wrexham and Prestatyn; in English Maelor, such as Overton; in central Powys, such as Newtown and Knighton; and in southeastern Monmouthshire, including Chepstow and Shirenewton.

See also 
 Anglo-Scottish border
 Berwick upon Tweed
 Church of England border polls 1915–1916
 Cross-border derby
 Cultural relationship between the Welsh and the English
 Debatable lands
 History of Wales
 List of Anglo-Welsh Wars
 Little England beyond Wales
 Lloegyr
 Monmouthshire (historic)
 Offa's Dyke Path
 Republic of Ireland–United Kingdom border
 Severnside derby
 Welsh Marches

References

Further reading

 
1536 establishments in England
1536 establishments in Wales
English law
Geographic history of the United Kingdom
Welsh nationalism
History of Shropshire
History of Cheshire
History of Gloucestershire
History of Herefordshire
Territorial evolution